Eriocaulon decangulare, commonly known as ten-angled pipewort, hat pin and bog button, is a monocotyledonous plant native to the eastern United States, Mexico and Nicaragua. The plant's distribution is quite irregular, with several disjunct populations and a discontinuous primary range. Most of its habitat in the United States runs along the Atlantic Coastal Plain, but some populations also occur in more  mountainous regions. It is found in areas of relatively low elevation and the plant does not occur higher than 300 metres above sea level. This pipewort is found in peat and sand that is moist to wet and associated with savannahs, bogs, low pinelands, ditches and the banks of cypress domes.

Distribution and habitat
Eriocaulon decangulare is found in the United States, Mexico and Nicaragua. In the United States it is mainly confined to the Atlantic Coastal Plain, but several significant outlying populations also exist in more mountainous and inland regions. It does appear to be absent from the intermediate Piedmont region, however. The northernmost populations are in coastal New Jersey and Delaware, stretching south to Florida. There is a significant break in the range along the coast in Georgia. The range then extends along the Gulf Coast though Alabama and Mississippi and just enters Louisiana. There is also a relatively large disjunct distribution in northern Alabama. The primary range breaks once more before starting again in central Louisiana, whence it extends into eastern Texas. Southern Arkansas supports another large disjunct distribution.

Ecology
A study in North Carolina of three inland, mountainous populations found the ten-angled pipewort has a high affinity for acidic soil, ranging from a pH 4.1 to 5.2 in their samples. At all sites, 58 to 71% of all the plants it occurred with were either obligate or facultative wetland plants. Sphagnum mosses were another conspicuous element of the habitat, with 30 to 60% of the studied sites being covered with them. The results of the study suggest that Eriocaulon decangulare benefits from disturbance due to its affinity for high sunlight. The smallest population examined was in only 50% full sunlight, while the other two were in full sunlight more than 90% of the day and supported much larger populations. As such, the control of woody plant growth, either naturally or artificially, is important to maintain healthy populations of the plant. The ten-angled pipewort was found to occur with several rare or threatened wetland plants, such as Cleistes divaricata (spreading pogonia), Drosera rotundifolia (round-leaved sundew), Carex trichocarpa (hairy-fruit sedge) and Sanguisorba canadensis (Canada burnet), though these associations differed from site to site.

References

Further reading

External links

Profile at USDA PLANTS Database

decangulare
Flora of North America
Plants described in 1753
Taxa named by Carl Linnaeus